Pegasus Mail is a proprietary email client developed by David Harris (who also develops the Mercury Mail Transport System). It was originally released in 1990 for internal and external mail on NetWare networks with MS-DOS  and later Apple Macintosh clients. It was subsequently ported to Microsoft Windows, which is now the only platform actively supported. Previously freeware, Pegasus Mail is now donationware.

The early versions of Pegasus were installed on MS-DOS or Mac workstations on a Netware network, and supported only mail between network users; for external (Internet) the Mercury Mail Transport System for Netware was required.

Features
Pegasus Mail (PMail) is suitable for single or multiple users on stand-alone computers and for internal and Internet mail on local area networks. Pegasus Mail has minimal system requirements compared with competing products, for instance the installed program (excluding mailboxes) for version 4.52 requires only around 13.5 MB of hard drive space. Since Pegasus Mail does not make changes to the Windows registry or the system directory, it is suitable as a portable application for USB drives. It is available in German (as well as English), in the past language packs were available for French and Italian.

A significant feature of the Microsoft Windows version of Pegasus Mail is that users have the choice not to use Microsoft Internet Explorer's HTML layout engine when displaying HTML email. Malicious HTML tends to be highly dependent on the exact target application and OS, therefore by avoiding both the ubiquitous HTML renderer supplied with Windows and not allowing automation commands such as ActiveX and JavaScript to execute from within an email in its inbuilt renderer, Pegasus reduces substantially the risk of infection from viewing email. (Note that this is not the same as the risk of malicious email or email attachments if opened outside Pegasus.)

Pegasus has the facility, not provided by all mail clients, optionally to download headers only, allowing the user to select mail to ignore for now and deal with later, download and delete from the server (normal mail operation for POP3 access), download a copy of a message while leaving it on the server, or delete without downloading. Mail may be marked by the user as read or unread, overriding the default setting.

Supported protocols
The original version worked with Novell NetWare networks and their Message Handling System (MHS) mail system; a cut-down MHS-only version called FirstMail was bundled with NetWare. Early versions used only a non-standard format for mail folders; later versions offer the standard Unix mailbox format as an alternative to the Pegasus Mail format. Although no longer developed or supported, older versions for MS-DOS and Apple Macintosh are still available.

A problem with early versions is that mail was stored on the NetWare System volume. This was not a problem when messages were brief text files. Later it was possible, although rather complicated, to store received mail on another volume, but new mail had to remain on System. This caused problems with NetWare servers with a small System volume and larger ones for data storage, as users often kept many large messages in their new mail folders.

Pegasus Mail supports the POP3, IMAP, and SMTP protocols as well as Novell's MHS. Release 4.41 added support for filtering of spam with header and body checking for key phrases (already before download). Release 4.41 also has, amongst other features, an improved HTML rendering engine, better support for special character encoding (especially with UTF-8), phishing protection, and a full-fledged Bayesian spam filter.

Pegasus Mail for Windows can be used as a standalone mail client using POP3 or IMAP for incoming mail and SMTP for outgoing, or on a NetWare or Windows network in conjunction with the Mercury Mail Transport System for Windows or NetWare, also by David Harris, running on a network server to receive mail and distribute it to users. While Pegasus Mail and Mercury handle email only, the function of Pegasus Mail is comparable to Microsoft Outlook's mail handling, and Mercury to Microsoft Exchange Server.

Criticism of features
Pegasus Mail pioneered many features now taken for granted with other email clients, such as filtering and simultaneous access to multiple POP3 and IMAP4 accounts. However, the free distribution of Microsoft Outlook Express or later email client as a standard part of Microsoft Windows since Windows 98, and the distribution of Microsoft Outlook, initially free of charge with PC magazines and then as an integral part of Microsoft Office, from 1997 dealt a significant blow to the market share of Pegasus Mail for Windows and other email clients, from which many never fully recovered.

Also, with the widespread distribution of Microsoft Outlook, user expectations of the range of features a program incorporating an email client should offer (Outlook's email, newsgroups, calendar, etc., eventually as part of an integrated suite) did not fulfil new users' expectations, regardless of the features of the email client proper. Trends in interface design also changed over the years, and Pegasus Mail did not follow those changes, still having essentially the same user interface it had in its first Windows version, with very few later additions (such as the "preview window" mode).

Pegasus was initially a text-mode application for networks, handling both internal and Internet mail, often operating in conjunction with the Mercury mail transport. Pegasus Mail for stand-alone machines was initially developed at a time when the typical email user had to be somewhat more knowledgeable of the way computers, the Internet and particularly email operate than most of today's users have to be, as PCs and the Internet have become more widespread, reached a broader audience and adapted themselves to those new users' needs. At the time Pegasus Mail was first conceived, its extensive array of features coupled with a simple user interface provided an ideal mix for most users' needs. As years went by it was seen as departing from the de facto standard, and lacking features expected by the typical user.

Advanced features
Pegasus Mail's takes an "old-fashioned" approach with advantages for knowledgeable users with complex email usage patterns, or who need special features. Some examples include:
 support for three encoding standards (MIME, uuencoding and BinHex);
 a powerful filtering system, so much so that it is possible to run a fully automated client-based electronic mailing list (including processing subscribe and unsubscribe requests and forwards to moderation) using solely Pegasus Mail;
 the ability to automatically select which email address to send a reply from, based on the mail folder containing the original received message;
 the ability to include custom e-mail header lines (useful for tracking emails, for example);
 the ability to delete attachments without deleting the message's text body, or to delete the HTML version of a message while keeping the plain-text version, or vice versa, saving disk space;
 easy access to a message, including all headers, in raw form, which is difficult or impossible in some other clients;
 a "tree view" of the structure of a multipart message with all its sections and attachments, giving access to view or save any of the parts separately
 support for downloading headers only, then deciding for each message whether to download, delete, or leave for later ("Selective mail download"). It is possible to download a message in full without deleting it from the server.

The drop in usage and funding slowed development, and features that were initially to be included in version 4 were not implemented. Some of these features are scheduled for inclusion in version 5.

Development status
The development of versions for DOS (MS-DOS and PC DOS 5.0 and higher), Apple Macintosh and 16-bit Windows (Windows 3.1 and higher) stopped in or before 2000. The latest released versions for DOS (3.50, released in or around June 1999) and 16-bit Windows (3.12b, released on 24 November 1999) are available for download. (Version 3.12c for 16-bit Windows was in beta-testing during 2000 but has not been released.) The Mac version (2.21 from 1997) can be found on some ftp servers that in the past offered an official Pegasus mirror service.

Until 2006 all versions of Pegasus Mail were supplied free of charge, and printed user manuals were available for purchase. In January 2007 it was announced that distribution and development of Pegasus Mail had ceased due to inadequate financial support from the sale of the manuals. Later in the month, due to an avalanche of support from the user community, it was announced that development would resume. However, Pegasus Mail would change from freeware to donationware and Mercury would change to a licence for fee for configurations with more than a certain number of email boxes. A donation button was added to the website on 1 March 2007.

A public beta test version of version 4.5 was announced on 3 October 2008 which is stated to be "very complete and stable, but is provided without formal technical support - you should almost certainly apply due diligence testing to it before using it in a production environment". The new version has not only been developed further beyond earlier versions, but has been ported from now obsolete v5.02 of Borland C++ to Microsoft Visual Studio 2008, a major undertaking in itself. A list of changes and other information is linked from here.

On 19 June 2009 Harris announced on the Pegasus Mail site that all development of Pegasus Mail and the associated Mercury program could only continue if sufficient users would commit to donating US$50 annually; on 21 July 2009 he said that there had been a good start.

On 3 July 2009 Pegasus Mail 4.51 and Mercury/32 v4.72 were released.

On 23 January 2010 Pegasus Mail 4.52 was released, which included improvements for Windows 7.

On 2 November 2010 Harris posted the following message regarding the progress of development
on the newest release of Pegasus Mail, PMail Version 5.0:

On 23 February 2011 Pegasus Mail 4.61 was released. It includes a new HTML renderer which uses the built-in Windows renderer of Internet Explorer, but the BearHTML renderer has also been improved and can be used instead. V. 4.61 included new graphics and an updated interface. v4.62 had improvements to the editor and elsewhere.

On 22 December 2011 bug fix version 4.63 became available.

On 8 March 2014 version 4.70 was released. This version includes Hunspell for spelling check and OpenSSL for encryption besides further improvements. v4.71 was released in January 2016. Version 4.72 was released in April 2016.

On 7 June 2018 version 4.73 was released. This includes a much improved help file.

On 25 December 2019 Harris said that, while there has been a delay due to health issues, he "can only promise you that there is progress, and that [he is] totally committed to getting these new versions released" and he is working, among others, on support for OAuth2 and OpenSSL v 1.1.1.

On 14 February 2022 a new version 4.80 was released. There were several overall improvements. Some are: OpenSSL was updated to version 1.1.1k, new support for 120dpi screens and an optimization for the HTML editor for better rendering. The anticipated support for OAuth2 was delayed into later this year.

Wiki
Since February 2009 Pegasus Mail has had its own Wiki, used as an on-line knowledge resource. The Wiki has crashed around 2014 and has not been restored since but parts of it have been archived by the Internet Archive.
There is also a community driven forum, which could help solve problems and knowledge resource.

Linux
There is no Linux version of Pegasus Mail. Pegasus runs under Linux using the Wine compatibility layer.

See also
 Comparison of e-mail clients
 Comparison of feed aggregators
 Mercury Mail Transport System

Further reading

Notes and references

External links
 

Windows email clients
Freeware
Portable software
Information technology in New Zealand